Ingarsby railway station was a railway station in Ingarsby, Leicestershire, on the Great Northern Railway Leicester branch. It opened in 1882, and closed to regular passenger trains and goods on 7 December 1953 but a workmen's service continued until 29 April 1957 .

Although the correct spelling for the locality is Ingarsby, the station appeared in railway publications as "Ingersby", including Bradshaw for August 1887, July 1902, July 1922 and October 1931, as well as The Railway Clearing House Handbook of Railway Stations 1904. It appeared as "Ingarsby for Houghton" in Bradshaw for December 1944 and in the LNER timetable for May 6th 1946. It was advertised as the station for Houghton on the Hill.

The station building survives today as a private residence.

References

Disused railway stations in Leicestershire
Railway stations in Great Britain opened in 1882
Railway stations in Great Britain closed in 1953
Former Great Northern Railway stations